Abiel Wood (July 22, 1772 – October 26, 1834) was a U.S. Representative from Massachusetts.

Early life 
Born in Pownalborough in Massachusetts Bay's Province of Maine (now known as Wiscasset), he was the son of Gen. Abiel Wood (1743–1811) and Betsey Tinkham, both originally of Middleborough. He was the second of eleven children.

Education and career 
Wood attended the common schools, then engaged in mercantile pursuits. He served as member of the Massachusetts House of Representatives 1807–1811, and again in 1816.

Wood was elected as a Democratic-Republican to the Thirteenth Congress (March 4, 1813 – March 3, 1815).  He was an unsuccessful candidate for reelection in 1814 to the Fourteenth Congress, but served as delegate to the constitutional convention of Maine in 1819.  He was a Maine State councilor, after which he resumed mercantile pursuits and also engaged in shipping.  He served as Bank commissioner for Maine until his death in Belfast on October 26, 1834.  He was interred in Woodlawn Cemetery in Wiscasset.

Personal life 
He married Hannah Hodge on November 30, 1793, in Wiscasset.  They had one child, a daughter named Helen, who married John Hannibal Sheppard.

References

Davis, William T., Ancient Landmarks of Plymouth, Boston: A. Williams & Co., 1883.
Knowlton, Charles Bowles, Marriage Notices For The Whole United States, 1785 – 1794, Salem Mass.: 1900.
Massachusetts: Vital Records to the Year 1850, Boston, 1910.
England families, genealogical and memorial: a record of the Achievements of her people in the making of Commonwealths and the Founding of a Nation'', Volume 1 page 281, (1914). Edited by William Richard Cutter.

1772 births
1834 deaths
People from Wiscasset, Maine
Massachusetts Democratic-Republicans
Maine Democratic-Republicans
Members of the Massachusetts House of Representatives
Democratic-Republican Party members of the United States House of Representatives from the District of Maine
Members of the United States House of Representatives from Massachusetts